Destroyer (subtitled as: Or About How to Philosophize with the Hammer) is the fourth studio album by Norwegian black metal band Gorgoroth. It was their first release on Nuclear Blast. It contains eight tracks performed by several different lineups, with band founder Infernus being the only member to be featured on all tracks. Four different vocalists were featured on the album, including Infernus on two tracks, Pest on four tracks, and T-Reaper and new vocalist Gaahl each on one track.

Destroyer was the first album to feature Gaahl and guitarist Tormentor, the only one for T-Reaper and drummer Vrolok,  the last to feature Pest until his return in 2008, and the last for drummer Frost until his return in 2004.

The album was re-released in 2006 by Back on Black Records as a gatefold vinyl LP. The subtitle of the album, Or About How to Philosophize with the Hammer, was also the subtitle of Friedrich Nietzsche's book Twilight of the Idols (itself a future Gorgoroth album title).

Track listing

Personnel

Gorgoroth
Infernus – guitars (tracks 2–7), bass (tracks 1, 3, 5 and 6), vocals (tracks 6 and 8), drums (tracks 5 and 6), mixing (February 1998 at Abyss Studio), production

Additional personnel
Tormentor – guitar (1, 2, 4–7)
Pest – vocals (tracks 2, 4, 5 and 7)
Gaahl – vocals (track 1), mixing
Ares – bass (tracks 2, 4 and 7)
Daimonion – synthesizer (track 3)
Frost – drums (track 3)
T-Reaper – vocals (track 3)
Vrolok – drums (tracks 2, 4 and 7)
Pytten – engineering (Grieghallen Studio)
Peter Tägtgren – mixing

References

Gorgoroth albums
1998 albums